Joseph Dominic Callero (born August 26, 1962) is an American college basketball coach, most recently the head men's basketball coach at California Polytechnic State University-San Luis Obispo (Cal Poly). He replaced outgoing coach Kevin Bromley in 2009.

Prior to accepting the job at Cal Poly, Callero spent eight seasons as the head coach at Seattle University.

Callero grew up with his Italian Catholic family in Enumclaw, Washington, and is one of 16 children. He is married to his wife of 25 years, Erika and has a 21 year old daughter.

Head coaching record

References

External links
 Cal Poly profile
 Seattle profile

1962 births
Living people
American men's basketball coaches
American people of Italian descent
Basketball coaches from Washington (state)
College men's basketball head coaches in the United States
Cal Poly Mustangs men's basketball coaches
Central Washington University alumni
High school basketball coaches in Washington (state)
Junior college men's basketball coaches in the United States
People from Enumclaw, Washington
People from Mercer Island, Washington
Puget Sound Loggers men's basketball coaches
Seattle Redhawks men's basketball coaches
Sportspeople from King County, Washington
USC Trojans men's basketball coaches